The 1877–78 Welsh Cup was the first season of the Welsh Cup. The cup was won by Wrexham who defeated Druids 1–0 in the final.

First round

Source: Welsh Football Data Archive

Replay

Source: Welsh Football Data Archive

Second replay

Source: Welsh Football Data Archive

Rhosllanerchrugog receive a bye to the next round

 Believing that it was a Rugby Union competition Swansea RFC scratched to Aberystwyth when officials learned that it was one for football.

Second round

Source: Welsh Football Data Archive

Replay

Source: Welsh Football Data Archive

Third round

Source: Welsh Football Data Archive

Replay

Source: Welsh Football Data Archive

Second replay

Source: Welsh Football Data Archive

Bangor receive bye to next round

Semi-final

Source: Welsh Football Data Archive

Replay

Source: Welsh Football Data Archive

Wrexham receive bye to next round

Final

The final of the inaugural Welsh Cup tournament was played at Acton Park, Wrexham on 30 March 1878 between Wrexham and Druids of Ruabon. The match was a cliffhanger, with no score until the Wrexham forwards charged the Druids' defenders to take the ball over the line to win the game in the final minute, with James Davies being credited with the goal.

References

 The History of the Welsh Cup 1877-1993 by Ian Garland (1991) 
 Welsh Football Data Archive

1871-72
Welsh Cup
Wel